This article contains information about the literary events and publications of 1502.

Events
June – England's Poet Laureate John Skelton is believed to have been tried, in a case brought by the London Prior of St Bartholomew's, and subsequently imprisoned, possibly at the instigation of Cardinal Wolsey.
unknown dates 
Aldine Press editions of Dante's Divine Comedy, Herodotus' Histories (in Greek and Italian parallel text) and Sophocles are published in Venice.
The English poet Stephen Hawes is appointed Groom of the Chamber to King Henry VII of England.

New books

Prose
Niccolò Machiavelli – Discourse about the Provision of Money (Discorso sopra la provisione del danaro)
Shin Maha Thilawuntha – Yazawin Kyaw

Drama
Gil Vicente – Monólogo do Vaqueiro ("Monologue of the Cowboy")

Poetry

Pietro Bembo – Terzerime (published by Aldus Manutius)
Conradus Celtis – Amores
Baptista Mantuanus – Sylvae
Jacopo Sannazaro – Arcadia (pirated edition)

Births
Guillaume Bigot, French writer, doctor, humanist and poet in French and Latin (died 1550)
probable – Benedetto Varchi, Florentine humanist, historian and poet in Latin (died 1565)

Deaths
February – Olivier de la Marche, French poet and chronicler (born 1426)
March 14 – Felix Fabri (Felix Faber), Swiss Dominican theologian and travel writer (born c. 1441)
unknown dates
Jalaladdin Davani, Iranian philosopher, theologian, jurist and poet (born 1426)
Henry Medwall, English dramatist (born c. 1462)
Octavien de Saint-Gelais, French churchman, poet and translator (born 1468)
Sōgi (宗祇), Japanese Zen monk and renga poet (born 1421)
probable
Gwerful Mechain, Welsh erotic poet (born c. 1460)
Bonino Mombrizio, Milanese lawyer, bureaucrat, philologist, humanist, editor of ancient writings and poet in Latin (born 1424)

References

1502

1502 books
Years of the 16th century in literature